Bring Yer Wellies is the sixth album by Celtic band Gaelic Storm.  It was released on July 25, 2006. "Wellies" is a nickname for Wellington boots, which feature prominently in the lyrics of "Kelly's Wellies" and on the album cover.

Track listing
All arrangements by Gaelic Storm.

"Scalliwag" (Twigger, Murphy) – 3:30
"Me and the Moon" (Twigger) – 4:22
"Never Drink 'Em Dry (Johnny Tarr's Funeral)" (Murphy, Wehmeyer, Twigger) – 3:02
"The Devil Down Below" (Twigger) – 3:24
"Dé Luain, Dé Máirt" (Murphy, Twigger, trad. lyrics) – 3:04
"Bare in the Basin" (Purvis) – 3:24
"Kelly's Wellies" (Murphy, Wehmeyer, Twigger) – 3:52
"Slingshot" (trad.) – 3:24
"Hello Monday" (Twigger) – 3:17
"The Long Way Home" (Twigger) – 4:27
"The Salt Lick" (trad.) – 3:43
"Don't Go for 'The One'" (Twigger, Murphy) – 2:10
"Tornado Alley" (trad.) – 3:35
"Kiss Me I'm Irish" (Twigger, Murphy, Wehmeyer, Reid) – 5:02

Personnel
Gaelic Storm
 Patrick Murphy (accordion, harmonica, spoons, lead vocals)
 Steve Twigger (guitar, bouzouki, mandolin, lead vocals)
 Ryan Lacey (drums, percussion)
 Ellery Klein (fiddle, vocals)
 Peter Purvis (Highland bagpipes, Uilleann pipes, Deger pipes, whistles)

Additional personnel
 Jeff May (bass)
 Rob Forkner (bodhran)
 Michael Ramos (accordion)
 Lauren DeAlbert (didgeridoo)

Sources and links 
 

Gaelic Storm albums
2006 albums